Balyklykul (Balıqlıkül) is a rural locality (a village) and the administrative centre of Balyklykulsky Selsoviet, Aurgazinsky District, Bashkortostan, Russia. The population was 417 as of 2010. There are 7 streets.

Geography 
Balyklykul is located 10 km southwest of Tolbazy (the district's administrative centre) by road. Chishma is the nearest rural locality.

References 

Rural localities in Aurgazinsky District